Ciarán Walsh (b. 1980 in Carlow, Ireland) is a contemporary Irish artist currently living and working in Berlin.

Education 
Walsh studied in the Dún Laoghaire Institute of Art, Design and Technology gaining a BA in 'Fine Art' in 2003 and later the National College of Art and Design, Dublin earning an  MA in ‘Art in the Contemporary World’ in 2007.

Career 
He has exhibited in Mothers Tankstation (Dublin, 2008), VISUAL (Carlow, 2009), Project Arts (Dublin, 2010), Galway Arts Centre (2010).

Bibliography

Walsh, Ciarán (2017). The Sickness, Book One. Düsseldorf/Berlin: TFGC Publishing.

References

External links

Official site

1980 births
Living people
Irish sculptors
People from County Carlow
Irish contemporary artists
Alumni of the National College of Art and Design
Alumni of IADT